Cornelis Verhoeven (2 February 1928 – 11 June 2001) was a Dutch philosopher and writer.

Early life and education
Verhoeven was born in Udenhout, the fourth child of seven from a farmer's family in the south of the Netherlands.  He attended a catholic priest seminary but was asked to leave. He then studied classics, philosophy and religious studies at the University of Nijmegen and earned his Ph.D. with the thesis Symboliek van de voet on 19 October 1956.

Career
Verhoeven taught Latin and Greek at the Jeroen Bosch College for 27 years. Then he became a professor of philosophy at the University of Amsterdam. He published more than 80 books. He has written original work on wonder, reality, violence, religion, contemplation and language, and interpretations and translations of classical and modern philosophers such as Heraclitus, Plato, Geulincx, Leibniz, Nietzsche and Heidegger. His work has been translated into English, German and Italian, and has been awarded the Anne Frank prize and the P. C. Hooft prize.

One of his best known books was The Philosophy of Wonder.

Personal
Verhoeven had two children, Neeltje (1973) and Daan, a freediver and photographer (1974). He died in Den Bosch, on 11 June 2001.

Selected publications
 Cornelis Verhoeven: The philosophy of wonder. Transl. by Mary Foran. New York, MacMillan, 1972. No ISBN
   
Verhoeven's full bibliography consists of more than 3700 titles in Dutch.

References

External links
 Personal website (in English), by his son Daan Verhoeven
 Profile at dbnl

1928 births
2001 deaths
20th-century Dutch philosophers
Dutch essayists
Dutch pacifists
People from Udenhout
Radboud University Nijmegen alumni
Academic staff of the University of Amsterdam
20th-century essayists